This is a list of individual and team records for the Six Nations Championship and its predecessors the Five Nations and Home Nations Championships.

Individual

Appearances

The top 15 players with the most appearances in the championship are listed. Those still playing at international level appear in bold type. (Updated 18 March 2023)

Points

All players with at least 250 points in the championship are listed. Those still playing at international level appear in bold type. (Updated 18 March 2023)

Tries

All players with at least 18 tries in the championship are listed. Those still playing at international level appear in bold type.

Scoring

Team

Match
Most points by one team
 v  2001 80 points

Most points by a losing team
 v Wales 2001 35 points
 v England 2015 35 points

Most points in one match
 -  2001 103 points 80-23

Most points in a drawn match
 -  2019 38-38

Most tries by one team
 v Wales 1887 12 tries

Most tries in one match
 -  1887 12 tries 12-0
 -  2001 12 tries 10-2
 -  2015 12 tries 7-5

Biggest winning margin
 v Italy 2001 57 points 80-23

Biggest away winning margin
 v Italy 2017 53 points 63-10

Season
Most points scored in a Season
 2001 229 points

Most points conceded in a Season
 2021 239 points

Fewest points scored in a Six Nations Season
  2004 42 points

Fewest points conceded in a Six Nations Season
  2003 46 points

Most tries scored in a Season
 2001 29 tries

Most tries conceded in a Season
  2021 34 tries 

Fewest tries scored in a Six Nations Season
 2004 2 tries 
 2009 2 tries 

Fewest tries conceded in a Six Nations Season
  2008 2 tries

Most tries in a Season
2019 84 tries (5.6 per match)

Biggest points difference in a Season
 2001 +149

Weakest points difference in a Season
 2021 -184

See also
Six Nations Championship
List of Six Nations Championship hat-tricks
List of Six Nations Championship Player of the Championship winners

References

External links
Six Nations official site

Records
Six Nations